Elizabeth Campbell Fisher Clay (1871-1959) was an American artist and painter. Clay studied art in Boston, New York, and Paris. After her marriage, she lived in Halifax, West Yorkshire, England and exhibited in London, including two exhibitions at the Royal Academy of Arts.

Early life
Elizabeth Campbell Fisher was born on April 2, 1871, in West Dedham, Massachusetts to Joseph and Mary Elizabeth Fisher. She attended Dedham High School. Her sister Hattie Smith Fisher was born in 1857. Joseph Lyman Fisher was born in 1861 and attended Highland Military Academy in Worcester, Massachusetts.

Education
She was  a student at Smith College in Northampton, Massachusetts, in the class of 1892. In the 1890s, she attended the Museum of Fine Arts, Boston. At the New York School of Art, she studied under William Merritt Chase and Robert Henri, and studied in the Netherlands and Spain. She also studied with the Art Students League of New York. She and two artists from Boston were students of Robert Henri and they shared a studio on Quai Voltaire in Paris. Henri came to the studio to review their work twice each week.

Career

Clay had a solo exhibition at  Rowland's Gallery in Boston in 1908. She also exhibited in Boston at the Copley Society of Art, Boston Art Club, and City Club. In England, she exhibited in London for over 30 years, at the Royal Academy of Arts in 1927 and 1928, and at the British Society of Women Artists, Yorkshire Union of Artists, and the Royal Cambrian Academy of Art. Her work is in the collection of the Telfair Museum of Art in Savannah, Georgia.

Marriage and family
She married Howard Clay on April 20, 1909, in Dedham, Massachusetts. Howard was a councillor and the alderman of Halifax, and served on the Halifax Education Committee. In 1910, she gave birth to Howard Fisher Clay and two years later Monica Mary was born. Monica was also an artist. They lived in Halifax, England, specifically Godley Halifax, by 1915.

In June 1930, by which point she was a widow, Clay laid the stone for the Halifax High School for Girls. The official opening of the school was performed by Princess Mary, Countess of Harewood. Clay was a Unitarian, where she taught Sunday school, and was active in college settlements and boys' clubs. She opposed women's suffrage. Clay was in the Lady's Who's Who in 1938.

Death

Clay died in Philadelphia in 1959.

References

1871 births
1959 deaths
Smith College alumni
School of the Museum of Fine Arts at Tufts alumni
Art Students League of New York alumni
American lithographers
American etchers
American women printmakers
Artists from Dedham, Massachusetts
Artists from Massachusetts
Students of Robert Henri
20th-century American women artists
20th-century American printmakers
Women etchers
Dedham High School alumni
Women lithographers
20th-century lithographers